Dream of Me may refer to:
 "Dream of Me" (Vern Gosdin song), 1981
 "Dream of Me" (Orchestral Manoeuvres in the Dark song), 1993
 "Dream of Me", a song from the Get Over It soundtrack